Nongdam is a village in Imphal East district, Manipur state, India. The village falls under Sowombung sub division. The village is partially connected by National Highway 202 that connects Jessami and Imphal. Nongdam is flanked by Leishiphung in the west, Itham in the south, Chadong in the east and Riha in the north. 
(Provide info in detailed manner) 
(Stop biased proclaims)

Total population
According to 2011 census, Nongdam comprises 178 households with the total of 850 people. The average sex ratio of the village is 1024 female to 1000 male which is higher than Manipur state average of 985.  Literacy rate of Nongdam is 70.44% with male literacy rate at 83.38% and female literacy rate at 57.91%.

People and occupation
The village is home to group of communities. Majority of the inhabitants are Christian and Sanamahis. Agriculture is the primary occupation of the inhabitants. The village is known in the district for its reserve natural environment, flora and fauna. Nongdam is a village located downstream the Mapithel Dam and is one of the adversely affected villages post commissioning of the multi-purpose project.

References

Villages in Imphal East district